Provincial Highway 74, also known as the Kuaiguan-Wufeng Expressway (快官烏日線) or Taichung Ring Expressway (台中環線), is an expressway around Taichung City. It starts at Kuaiguan Interchange on Freeway No. 3 in Changhua City and ends at Wufeng Interchange on Freeway No. 3 in Wufeng District.

Length

Main line
The total length of main line is 37.841 km. The route between Kuaiguan Interchange and Zhongqing Rd. was opened to the public on May 5, 2002. During this time it was known as the Taichung-Changhua Expressway (中彰快速道路). Afterwards, the east section between Songzhu Rd. and Wufeng Interchange was opened to the public on December 31, 2011. The route between Zhongqing Rd. and Chongde Rd. was opened to traffic on December 31, 2013.

Branch Line
The branch line (Provincial Highway No. 74A) which starts at the western end of Provincial Highway No. 74 (Kuaiguan Interchange) and ends at Provincial Highway No. 1 in Huatan, Changhua. Its length is 10.5km (6.5 miles).

Major Cities Along the Route
Changhua City
Taichung City

Exit list

Intersections with other Freeways and Expressways
Freeway No. 3 at Kuaiguan Interchange in Changhua City and Wufeng Interchange in Wufeng District.
Freeway No.4 at Tanzi JCT in Tanzi
Freeway No. 1 at Daya JCT in Daya.It is under construction and will open to traffic in 2023.

Notes
The original plan has a western section between Changhua Coastal Industrial Park and Hemei Interchange of Freeway in Hemei, Changhua. The exact route has now been constructed and named as Provincial Highway No. 61B. It was opened to the public on October 15, 2011.

See also
 Highway system in Taiwan

References
Notes

Sources
Directorate General of Highways, Ministry of Transportation and Communications

External links

|}|}

Highways in Taiwan